Frank Stone may refer to:

 Frank Stone (painter) (1800–1859), English painter
 Frank Mends Stone (1857–1942), Australian lawyer and politician
 Frank Stone (Wisconsin politician) (1876–1937)
 Frank Stone (Dream Team), a fictional character from the soap opera Dream Team